The Aleppo International Stadium is an Olympic-standard, multi-use, all-covered and all-seater stadium in the Syrian city of Aleppo. It is the largest stadium in Syria, and is currently used mostly for football matches. It serves as a home ground of Al-Ittihad football club. It also hosted some home games of the Syrian national football team. The stadium was opened in 2007 and holds up to  53,200 spectators. The venue is located near the al-Hamadaniah Sports City in the southwestern part of Aleppo.

History

The construction of the stadium was launched in 1980, based on the design of the Polish Constructor Stanislaw Kus with the assistance of architect Fawzi Khalifeh. It was scheduled to be completed in 1987 to become ready for the Mediterranean games. However, the construction process was stopped and delayed for 2 decades due to financial difficulties, until 2003 when the officials of the Syrian Government implemented a serious programme to overcome all difficulties.

Finally, after a record period of 27 years of construction, the stadium became ready with its entire facilities in early 2007. Officially, the stadium was opened on 3 April 2007 with an inaugural friendly match between Al-Ittihad SC and Fenerbahçe of Turkey which ended in a 2–2 draw. The first goal scored in the stadium came at the 8th minute of the inaugural match, through Abdul Fattah Al Agha. The Syrian president Bashar Al Assad and Prime Minister of Turkey Recep Tayyip Erdoğan attended the opening ceremony and the match.

Civil war 
It was severely damaged during the Syrian Civil War. Its facade and many of its indoor facilities were completely destroyed, and the pitch and tribunes took significant damage, especially from mortar fire.

The Syrian government started the process of repairing the stadium after the conclusion of the Battle of Aleppo (2012–2016). Iran has assisted Syria with repairs.

Facts

The stadium has five levels: the first level is the sport ground itself, with its surrounding facilities, the second level consists of training halls, different facilities and support services. The rest three levels are designed to host the attendants' seats; the first tier holds up to 25,000 seats while the second and the third host 14,000 each. The VIP hall located on the third level, is designed and decorated with oriental wood-works.

The stadium occupies an area of 3.5 hectares out of the 33 hectares of the whole sports complex. It is provided with two large electronic screens (10 tones, 7X15 meters each). The seats are all in light blue color with a small number of white colored seats placed in the eastern tribune to form the word "Aleppo" both in Arabic and English languages. The stadium is all-covered with a pre-built concrete. The parking area of the arena hosts more than 8,000 vehicles. The entry to the stadium is secured through 26 gates.

Notable matches

Opening match

AFC club play-off matches

2010 AFC Cup

Syria national football team matches

See also
 List of Asian stadiums by capacity

References

External links

The stadium at WorldStadiums

Sports venues completed in 2007
Football venues in Syria
Sports venues in Aleppo
2007 establishments in Syria